The 1995 South Australian National Football League (SANFL) Grand Final saw the Port Adelaide Magpies defeat the Central District Bulldogs by 48 points. The match was played on Sunday 1 October 1995 at Football Park in front of a crowd of 45,786.
.

This was Port Adelaide's 33rd premiership, and Central District's first grand final since their admission to the league in 1964.

Teams and statistics 
Port Adelaide was captained by Tim Ginever and coached by John Cahill.  Central District was captained by Roger Girdham and coached by Alan Stewart.

Umpires 
The game was umpired by Tim Pfeiffer, Kevin Chambers, and Mick Abbott.

Scorecard

Jack Oatey Medal 
The Jack Oatey Medal for best player in the Grand Final was awarded to Anthony Darcy of Port Adelaide.
For the third year in a row, the St Kilda Football Club in the AFL drafted the Jack Oatey medallist, following on from Steven Sziller and Darryl Wakelin.

External links 
 Port Adelaide Magpies Official Website
 Central District Football Club Official Website
 SANFL Official Website

References 

SANFL Grand Finals
Sanfl Grand Final, 1995